is a Japanese manga series written and illustrated by Yūichi Kinoshita. It was serialized in Kodansha's seinen manga magazine Young Magazine the 3rd from November 2018 to January 2021; the magazine ceased its publication in April 2021 and the manga resumed publication on Yanmaga Web in May 2022. Its chapters have been collected in four tankōbon volumes as of October 2022.

Publication
The series' last chapter in the magazine was published on January 6, 2021, and the manga entered on hiatus. Young Magazine the 3rd last issue was released on April 6, 2021. The series resumed publication on Yanmaga Web on May 2, 2022. Kodansha has collected its chapters into individual tankōbon volumes. The first volume was released on July 19, 2019. As of October 20, 2022, four volumes have been released.

Volume list

Reception
In 2020, the manga was one of the 50 nominees for the 6th Next Manga Awards.

References

External links
 

Kodansha manga
Romantic comedy anime and manga
School life in anime and manga
Seinen manga